Lukulu is a market town in the Western Province of Zambia, on the Zambezi River, and headquarters of a district of the same name. Access to the town is limited to only a few graded roads with traffic running through it from Kaoma town to Watopa town. Fish from the river provide most of the local diet, and some are exported to other parts of Zambia away from the river. The town has very beautiful Zambezi River water front and sandy beaches.

Geography
Lukulu is at the north end of the Zambezi's Barotse Floodplain which at that point has not developed its full character, being narrower and less flat than it is further south. Every year between December and March, the river rises above the low banks of its main channel and spreads across the floodplain.
  
There is a small pontoon ferry across the river, with a beach lying on the opposite bank of the main channel.  Lukulu is also home to a hospital, two markets and several schools. The rough roads are the only problem which stops trade and tourists from reaching the town.

Lukulu District
Lukulu District, population 68,375, stretches across the north-eastern and north-central parts of Western Province, adjoining North-Western Province and straddling the Zambezi and the northern Barotse Floodplain. The portion of the district west of the Zambezi is grassland and has no roads or towns, only dry season tracks to a few villages. It is rich in wildlife, the Liuwa Plain National Park extends into it from the south. East of the river the district is Miombo woodland and Zambezian cryptosepalum dry forest with Zambezian flooded grasslands adjacent to rivers. This part is served by a gravel road from Kaoma, and a gravel road to North-Western Province via the Kabompo Ferry.

References
 Visit Zambia Campaign

Barotse Floodplain
Populated places in Western Province, Zambia